Sevilla FC Superleague Formula team was the racing team of Sevilla FC, a football team that competes in Spain in La Liga. The Sevilla FC racing team competed in the Superleague Formula. They were operated by GTA Motor Competición.

2008 season
In the 2008 Superleague Formula season Sevilla FC finished 10th overall in the table with 262 points. Spanish driver Borja García was the Sevilla driver for all rounds.

Sevilla won the 2nd race of the opening 2008 Donington Park round.

2009 season
They did not return for the first 2 rounds of the 2009 season. However, they replaced Al Ain from round 3 of the championship.

Sébastien Bourdais joined the team for round 4 for the rest of the season.
He was the weekend winner of round 4 and round 5.

Record
(key)

2008

2009
Super Final results in 2009 did not count for points towards the main championship.

2010

References

External links
 Sevilla FC Superleague Formula team minisite
 Official Sevilla FC football club website

Sevilla FC
Superleague Formula club teams
2008 establishments in Spain